The canton of Lodève is an administrative division of the Hérault department, southern France. Its borders were modified at the French canton reorganisation which came into effect in March 2015. Its seat is in Lodève.

Composition

It consists of the following communes:
 
Agonès
Le Bosc
Brissac
Causse-de-la-Selle
Le Caylar
Cazilhac
Celles
Claret
Le Cros
Ferrières-les-Verreries
Fontanès
Fozières
Ganges
Gorniès
Laroque
Lauret
Lauroux
Lavalette
Lodève
Mas-de-Londres
Montoulieu
Moulès-et-Baucels
Notre-Dame-de-Londres
Olmet-et-Villecun
Pégairolles-de-Buèges
Pégairolles-de-l'Escalette
Les Plans
Poujols
Le Puech
Les Rives
Romiguières
Roqueredonde
Rouet
Saint-André-de-Buèges
Saint-Bauzille-de-Putois
Saint-Étienne-de-Gourgas
Saint-Félix-de-l'Héras
Saint-Jean-de-Buèges
Saint-Jean-de-la-Blaquière
Saint-Martin-de-Londres
Saint-Maurice-Navacelles
Saint-Michel
Saint-Pierre-de-la-Fage
Saint-Privat
Sauteyrargues
Sorbs
Soubès
Soumont
Usclas-du-Bosc
La Vacquerie-et-Saint-Martin-de-Castries
Vacquières
Valflaunès
Viols-en-Laval
Viols-le-Fort

Councillors

Following the death of Marie-Christine Bousquet , his substitute, Irène Tolleret, replaces her in Departmental council of Hérault.
Following Irène Tolleret's election as a Member of the European Parliament in 2019, a cantonal by-election is organized. Gaëlle Lévêque is elected with 70.85% of the votes.

Pictures of the canton

References

Cantons of Hérault